The Canton of Le Châtelet is a former canton situated in the Cher département and in the Centre region of France. It was disbanded following the French canton reorganisation which came into effect in March 2015. It consisted of 7 communes, which joined the canton of Châteaumeillant in 2015. It had 2,710 inhabitants (2012).

Geography
An area of lakes, rivers and farming in the southwestern part of the arrondissement of Saint-Amand-Montrond centred on the town of Le Châtelet. The altitude varies from 165m at Ids-Saint-Roch to 276m at Le Châtelet, with an average altitude of 215m.

The canton comprised 7 communes:
Ardenais
Le Châtelet
Ids-Saint-Roch
Maisonnais
Morlac
Rezay
Saint-Pierre-les-Bois

Population

See also
 Arrondissements of the Cher department
 Cantons of the Cher department
 Communes of the Cher department

References

Chatelet
2015 disestablishments in France
States and territories disestablished in 2015